Nicholas Christopher Kristock (born March 1, 1991) is an American soccer player at Oakland University. He won the 2013 Senior CLASS Award for Men's Soccer as the most outstanding senior student-athlete in NCAA Division I Men’s Soccer.

Kristock has earned an undergraduate degree in Business Administration from Oakland University and is currently pursuing a master's degree in Business Administration from Oakland University.  He has earned several major awards at Oakland University including the CSA Student Leader of the Year Award and the Human Relations Award given to an outstanding senior in community service (the first student athlete to win this award). Kristock is the Co-Founder of Gigs For Good Inc., a Christian non-profit organization that funds Christian missionaries around the world.

Kristock was named All-Horizon League second team and 2013 Horizon League All-Tournament Team. As captain of the Golden Grizzlies, he started every game in the 2013 season, logging over 1700 minutes on the year.

Kristock played for FC Sparta in the National Premier Soccer League, an American Soccer League recognized as the fourth tier league in the United States.

Kristock now plays for the Loganholme Lightning Football Club of the Trophy Superstore Premier League, formerly called the Brisbane Premier League, in Brisbane, Queensland, Australia. He was voted 2014 Senior Player of the Year by the club in October 2014.

References

External links
Oakland Golden Grizzlies profile

1991 births
Living people
American expatriates in Australia
American expatriate soccer players
Association football defenders
Businesspeople from Detroit
Businesspeople from Michigan
Expatriate soccer players in Australia
National Premier Soccer League players
Oakland Golden Grizzlies men's soccer players
People from Novi, Michigan
Soccer players from Michigan
American soccer players